Christopher Joseph Latham (born May 26, 1973) is a former professional outfielder. He is a switch hitter who is 6'0" tall, weighs 195 pounds, and throws right-handed.

Career
Latham played baseball at Basic High School in Henderson, Nevada, and in 1991 the Los Angeles Dodgers selected him in the June amateur draft, taking him with the 300th overall pick as part of the draft's 11th round. Latham enjoyed a breakout season with the Yakima Bears of the Northwest League in 1994, setting a club record with a .340 batting average . Latham also made the Northwest League's All-Star team that season, establishing himself as a prospect.

The Major League Baseball Players Association went on strike late in 1994, and as a result major league organizations attempted to field teams of replacement players in the spring training before the 1995 season. Latham was one of the Dodgers' replacement players that spring, but the two sides reached a deal before any regular-season replacement games were played.

On October 30, 1995, Latham was chosen as the player to be named later in a deal that had been concluded on July 31. Los Angeles received pitchers Kevin Tapani and Mark Guthrie from the Minnesota Twins, with Latham, Ron Coomer, Greg Hansell and José Parra going the other way. Latham made his major league debut with the Twins on April 12, 1997, appearing as a pinch runner for Todd Walker in an 11-6 win over the Kansas City Royals . He spent parts of the next three seasons with the Twins, but struggled to establish himself in the major leagues, and was traded to the Colorado Rockies for Scott Randall on December 7, 1999.

Latham spent all of the 2000 season at the AAA level, then signed with the Toronto Blue Jays organization as a minor league free agent. He enjoyed his most successful major league season with the Blue Jays in 2001, batting .274 with a .369 on-base percentage and a .425 slugging percentage in 73 at bats. After another season in AAA, he spent a brief time with the New York Yankees in 2003, then signed with Japan's Yomiuri Giants after being designated for assignment.

Latham spent the 2005 season with the independent Bridgeport Bluefish of the Atlantic League. Most recently, he represented the United States in the 2005 World Cup of Baseball, as one of four outfielders on America's team .

External links
 
 

1973 births
Living people
African-American baseball players
Albuquerque Dukes players
American expatriate baseball players in Canada
American expatriate baseball players in Japan
American expatriate baseball players in Mexico
Bakersfield Dodgers players
Baseball players from Idaho
Bridgeport Bluefish players
Colorado Springs Sky Sox players
Guerreros de Oaxaca players
Gulf Coast Dodgers players
Great Falls Dodgers players
Long Island Ducks players
Major League Baseball outfielders
Major League Baseball replacement players
Mexican League baseball center fielders
Minnesota Twins players
New York Yankees players
Nippon Professional Baseball outfielders
Norfolk Tides players
Salt Lake Buzz players
San Antonio Missions players
Syracuse SkyChiefs players
Toronto Blue Jays players
Winnipeg Goldeyes players
Vero Beach Dodgers players
Yakima Bears players
Yomiuri Giants players
21st-century African-American sportspeople
20th-century African-American sportspeople